"Whenever You Need Me" is a song by English band T'Pau, released as the lead single from their third studio album, The Promise (1991). It was written by Carol Decker and Ron Rogers, and produced by Andy Richards. "Whenever You Need Me" reached No. 16 on the UK Singles Chart and remained in the charts for six weeks. It was the band's last Top 40 hit in the UK.

The 7" single's B-side, "All the Love", was a non-album track exclusive to the single. In the UK, a limited edition box-set of the single was issued, featuring the 12" vinyl single and a life-size colour poster of Decker.

A music video was filmed to promote the single. The band also performed the song on the UK music show Top of the Pops, and the UK Saturday morning children show Gimme 5.

Critical reception
Upon its release as a single, Mark Frith of Smash Hits stated, "T'Pau! How tired life was without them. Welcome back indeed! More of the same 'melodic rock' that the nation will be humming for the next three years? Certainly. The charts are over here just where you left them." Peter Kinghorn of the Newcastle Evening Chronicle described the song as "a potent rock ballad." Tonia Macari of Aberdeen Evening Express praised it as "four minutes of perfected, polished, pop-rock with raunchy red-head Carol Decker's vocals as ear-shattering as ever". He added, "This will no doubt welcome the band back to Chartsville."

Steve Stewart of Aberdeen Press & Journal gave a mixed review, stating, "T'Pau, if anything, have a knack of composing artful hooklines that strike a chord somewhere. The trouble is Decker's irritating vocals whenever they reach anything above soft-ballad level. Still, a successful mix of keyboard overlays and pop-rock guitars." Music & Media wrote, "Serious comeback of the band who had a huge European hit with 'China in Your Hands' in 1987. This new single sounds as grotesque as melodic." In a review of The Promise, Adam Sweeting of The Guardian described the song as "a Eurovision fourth-placer if ever there was one" with "Decker's masonry-toppling vocals piled up in layers like a particularly indigestible aural lasagne".

Track listing
 7" single
"Whenever You Need Me" - 4:06
"All the Love" - 4:00

 12" single
"Whenever You Need Me (Extended)" - 6:15
"Whenever You Need Me (Single Version)" - 4:06
"All the Love" - 4:00

 CD single
"Whenever You Need Me" - 4:06
"Heart and Soul" - 3:40
"China in Your Hand" - 4:05
"I Will Be with You" - 4:06

Personnel
T'Pau
 Carol Decker – lead vocals
 Dean Howard – lead guitar
 Ronnie Rogers – rhythm guitar
 Michael Chetwood – keyboards
 Paul Jackson – bass guitar
 Tim Burgess – drums

Production
 Andy Richards - producer of "Whenever You Need Me", engineer on "Whenever You Need Me (Extended)"
 Ian Taylor - mixing on "Whenever You Need Me"
 Bob Ludwig - mastering on "Whenever You Need Me"
 Steve Williams - additional production and engineering on "Whenever You Need Me (Extended)"
 Chris Lord-Alge - mixing on "Whenever You Need Me (Extended)"
 T'Pau - producers of "All the Love"
 Ian Caple - engineer on "All the Love"
 Roy Thomas Baker - producer of "Heart and Soul", "China in Your Hand" and "I Will Be with You"

Other
 Tony McGee - photography
 An Old Friend with The Graphic Edge - artwork design

Charts

References

External links

1991 songs
1991 singles
T'Pau (band) songs
Virgin Records singles
Songs written by Carol Decker
Songs written by Ron Rogers